The Galápagos Islands are an island archipelago in the Pacific Ocean, part of Ecuador.

Galápagos can also refer to:
Galápagos Province, the province in Ecuador containing the islands
Galápagos National Park, the national park established by the government of Ecuador to protect the Islands
Galapagos (film), a 1955 travel and nature documentary film 
Galápagos (novel), a 1985 novel by American author Kurt Vonnegut
Galápagos (2006 TV series), a British nature documentary miniseries
Galapagos (2017 TV series), a British nature documentary miniseries
Galápagos (radio show), an Ecuadorian radio show
Galápagos, Guadalajara, municipality of the province of Guadalajara, Spain
Galapagos penguin
Galápagos tortoise
Galapagos (video game), a 1997 computer game by Electronic Arts
Galápagos syndrome, the phenomenon of a product or a society evolving in isolation from globalization
Galapagos NV, a Belgian pharmaceutical company.
Galápagos Microplate

See also
"Galapogos", a song by The Smashing Pumpkins from the 1995 album Mellon Collie and the Infinite Sadness